Comprehensive high schools are the most popular form of public high schools around the world, designed to provide a well-rounded education to its students, as opposed to the practice in some places in which examinations are used to sort students into different high schools for different populations. Other types of high schools specialize in university-preparatory school academic preparation, remedial instruction, or vocational instruction. The typical comprehensive high school offers more than one course program of specialization to its students. Comprehensive high schools generally offer a college preparatory course program and one or more foreign language, scientific or vocational course programs.

See also

 Comprehensive school – the equivalent in the UK and elsewhere
 Continuation high school
 Alternative school

References

Further reading
 

School types